The 2010 Beef 'O' Brady's Bowl was the third edition of the college football bowl game formerly known as the  St. Petersburg Bowl. This was the first edition of the bowl named after the Beef O'Brady's restaurant franchise. It was played at Tropicana Field in St. Petersburg, Florida, on Tuesday, December 21, 2010 at 8 p.m. (ET). The game was telecast on ESPN and featured the Southern Miss Golden Eagles from Conference USA (C-USA) versus the Louisville Cardinals from the Big East Conference.

Teams
The two teams were not strangers to one another, having both played in the same conference, as Louisville was a member of C-USA from 1996 through 2004. Southern Miss entered the game with an 18–9–1 series lead. The teams had played each other in a non-conference matchup during the 2009 season, with Louisville winning at home, 25–23.  This was the first time that the two schools had played each other in a bowl game.

Southern Miss

The Golden Eagles went to their ninth straight bowl game, the league's second longest active bowl streak. This was their first bowl trip to Florida in 29 years since playing Missouri in the 1981 Tangerine Bowl in Orlando.  Although the 2010 season proved to be a successful one on the field for the Golden Eagles, the most memorable public event was when three players were shot after a fight at a club spilled outside to the parking lot. Linebacker Martez Smith suffered the most serious injury, and is paralyzed from the waist down. The Golden Eagles went 1–1 following the tragic events, winning over Houston but losing a shootout to Tulsa.

Louisville

Under first year coach Charlie Strong the Cardinals returned to their first bowl game since the end of the 2006 season when they appeared in the Orange Bowl.  Louisville entered the contest with a 6–6 record after defeating Rutgers to become bowl eligible.  The Cardinals' defense ranked 12th in the nation in total defense during the regular season.  Louisville had gone to eight bowl games in nine years but had been absent from bowl play for the three seasons immediately preceding 2010.

Game summary

Scoring

Statistics

Source:

References

External links
Box score at ESPN

Beef 'O' Brady's Bowl
Gasparilla Bowl
Louisville Cardinals football bowl games
Southern Miss Golden Eagles football bowl games
Beef 'O' Brady's Bowl
21st century in St. Petersburg, Florida